The Dawson Valley Branch Railway was a railway line in Central Queensland, Australia. It branched from the Central Western railway line at Kabra in the Rockhampton Region and went to Theodore in the Shire of Banana. It opened in a series of sections between 1898 and 1927, and featured a rack railway section, one of only 3 such systems in Australia.

History

Gold was discovered in the Mount Morgan region of Central Queensland in 1882. The Mount Morgan Gold Mining Company was authorised by government in 1890 to build a railway link to Rockhampton but it did not proceed.

Revised plans were approved by Queensland Parliament in December 1896 for a government-built line. The 1890 proposal had involved a conventional line with 1 in 50 (2%) grades and a tunnel at the crest of the Razorback Range. Its cost and the risk of the mine having a short life deterred both the government and the company. By adopting a rack railway section the cost of building the line was 52% of the 1890 proposal.

The branch line commenced at Kabra about 15 kilometres west of Rockhampton on the Central West line and headed south towards Mount Morgan. The first stage opened on 15 June 1898 and reached Moonmera at the foot of a steep climb to Mount Morgan. A siding was located enroute at Boongary.

Abt rack section

The next stage to Moongan was a  Abt rack system to negotiate grades as steep as 1 in 16.5 (6%). The rack system consisted of 2 parallel toothed vertical bars fixed between the rails which connected with specially built locomotives. The rack locomotive pushed from the rear of the train during ascent to prevent runaways if a coupling broke, and the front during descent, as the rack provided part of the braking force. Kirkhall, Baree and Walterhall (which was the junction for the branch to the mine itself) were stops above the rack section. The line to Mount Morgan railway station opened on 26 November 1898.

After opening, three mixed trains ran daily to and from Rockhampton railway station. Two trains ran each way on Sundays thus enabling visitors to conveniently travel the short distance between Mount Morgan and Rockhampton. Despite the high cost of operating the rack section, the line proved very profitable due to the volume of traffic created by, and for the mine. 'Suburban' services ran from Moongan to Mount Morgan and return to cater for mine workers.

Southwest extension

The discovery of coal in the Dawson Valley in 1900 generated interest in extending the line from Mount Morgan. Parliament approved a south-west extension in late 1909 to take the line as far as Baralaba.  It opened in three stages. Terminating at Wowan, the first stage opened on 16 October 1912 and en route sidings appeared at Talban, Kenbula, Ulogie, Muranu, Walmul, Konara, Gelobera, Wura, Dululu and Littles Crossing. The second stage took the line via Buneru, Cooneel and Muruguran to Rannes and opened on 2 February 1915. The third stage opened on 30 July 1917 and terminated at Baralaba after passing through Kokotungo and Kalewa.

The Callide Valley line junctioned at Rannes when it opened in 1924.

The transport of coal to Mount Morgan and for the Railways Department was a major contributor to the extended service.

The proposed Dawson Valley Irrigation Scheme was to open up agricultural land for close settlement along the Dawson River and was expected to create 5 irrigation zones with 5000 farms and a total population of 50,000 on its farms and towns. The first of these irrigation zone towns was to be Theodore. This prompted approval of a  extension further south from Baralaba along the Dawson Valley in 1922. It was completed in two stages – via Harcourt, Mungi, Moura and Gibihi terminating at Nipan on 21 June 1926, and then via Willawa terminating at Theodore (previously called Castle Creek) on 7 May 1927. In its original conception, the line was to be subsequently extended from Theodore to Delusion Creek in Isla to support the Isla irrigation zone. However, the Nathan Dam, the centrepiece of the Dawson Valley Irrigation Scheme, was never built, and the extension to Delusion Creek was never required.

The service to Theodore was laborious. A mixed train arrived at 4.30am twice a week and departed at 7.30am. The journey to Mount Morgan took almost 8 hours. A weekly rail motor service introduced in 1952 reduced the journey to Rockhampton to some 6 ½ hours.

Bypassing the rack

The rack railway section near Mount Morgan was closed in 1952 after a conventional line was built to bypass it, with grades of 1 in 50 (2%). This occurred because the rack locomotives were due for replacement and the rack section was becoming a bottleneck in the haulage of coal from Callide Coalfields.

In 1961 a new coal mine (now known as the Dawson mine) was opened south-east of the town of Moura. Initially coal was loaded at a siding at Kianga, 15 km south of Moura. In 1963 a 12 km line was built from Moura to the new mine. At that time the most powerful steam locomotive owned by QR known as the Beyer-Garratt could haul a 750-ton coal load.

Partial closure
Sections from Kabra to Mount Morgan and Wowan (69 km) and from Baralaba to Moura (47 km) were closed from 1 August 1987 and the lines were taken up, except for a short section at Mt Morgan. The Goolara-Theodore section (5 km) closed in 1993, and the Wowan-Rannes (25 km) and Kooemba-Baralaba (12 km) sections closed in 1995. Goolara is the site of a grain terminal, and the Goolara-Moura section is now effectively part of the Moura railway line.

Since 1968 Moura coal has been hauled to Gladstone via the Moura Short Line. When it opened, triple header diesel hauled trains took 4000 ton coal loads direct to Gladstone.

Route

Gallery

See also

Rail transport in Queensland

References

External links

 1925 map of the Queensland railway system

Closed railway lines in Queensland
Railway lines opened in 1898
Buildings and structures in Central Queensland
Rack railways in Australia